Rennie Montague Bere CMG (28 November 1907 in Bere Regis, Dorset – 23 March 1991 in Plymouth, Devon) was a British mountaineer, naturalist and nature conservationist. In 1928 he became a member of the Alpine Club, London. In 1957 he became a Companion of the Order of St. Michael and St. George.

Biography
Bere was the son of a clergyman. He was educated at Marlborough College and in 1926 entered Selwyn College, Cambridge. In 1930 he joined the British Colonial Service, went to Uganda and worked as District Commissioner and later as Provincial Commissioner for the northern Province. During his thirty years in Uganda he accomplished many feats of mountaineering and added to knowledge of the mountains particularly of the Ruwenzori range. Bere researched many inselbergs, the Imatong range on the Sudanese border and the Virunga volcano. In 1955 he became  Director and Chief Ranger of the Uganda National Parks. In 1960 he left Uganda with his wife Anne Maree, whom he had married in Uganda in 1936, and lived in retirement at West Cottage near Bude in Cornwall.

Bere published about a dozen books including The Way to the Mountains of the Moon (1966), Antelopes (1970), The Nature Of Cornwall (1982) and his autobiography A Cuckoo's Parting Cry: a personal account of life and work in Uganda between 1930 and 1960 (1990).

Selected works
The Wild Mammals of Uganda and Neighbouring Regions of East Africa, 1961
The Way to the Mountains of the Moon, 1966
Wild Animals in an African National Park, 1966
The African Elephant, 1966 (German translation: Die Welt der Tiere: Der Afrikanische Elefant, translated by Odo Walther, 1976)
Birds in an African National Park, 1969
Antelopes (German translation: Die Welt der Tiere: Antilopen, translated by Theodor Haltenorth), 1970
Wildlife in Cornwall: a naturalist’s view of the southwestern peninsula, 1970
Crocodile’s Eggs for Supper, and other Animal Tales from Northern Uganda, 1973
Mammals of East and Central Africa, 1975
The Story of Bude Haven, 1977
The Book of Bude and Stratton, 1980
The Nature of Cornwall: the wildlife and ecology of the county, 1982
A Cuckoo’s Parting Cry: a personal account of life and work in Uganda between 1930 and 1960, 1990

Sources

A. D. M. Cox: "In Memoriam Rennie Montague Bere", in: Alpine Journal; 1992, pp. 325–326
Geoff Milburn: "Obituary Rennie Montague Bere", in: The Climbers Club Journal; 1991 Volume XXI No. 1 (New Series), pp. 148–151
Ernest Kay: The International Authors and Writers Who's Who, International Biographical Centre, 1989 ; p. 65

References

British naturalists
British mountain climbers
1907 births
1991 deaths
20th-century naturalists
People educated at Marlborough College
Alumni of Selwyn College, Cambridge
Colonial Service officers
Companions of the Order of St Michael and St George
People from Dorset